Kota Damansara is an affluent township located in Petaling Jaya, Petaling District, Selangor, Malaysia. It is a township spread across .

It is also a state seat constituency which is sandwiched between Subang and Petaling Jaya. Notable landmarks located near the constituency are the Sultan Abdul Aziz Shah Airport and the Rubber Research Institute of Malaysia. Kota Damansara comes under the Sungai Buloh parliamentary constituency.

See also
 Kota Damansara Community Forest Park

References

Townships in Selangor